Lights of the Desert is a 1922 American silent Western film directed by Harry Beaumont and starring Shirley Mason, Allan Forrest and Edmund Burns.

When her theatrical troupe is stranded in Nevada, a young woman remains in the area where she falls in love with an oil well owner.

Cast
 Shirley Mason as Yvonne Laraby
 Allan Forrest as Clay Truxall
 Edmund Burns as Andrew Reed 
 Jim Mason as Slim Saunders 
 Andrée Tourneur as Marie Curtis
 Josephine Crowell as Ma Curtis
 Lillian Langdon as Susan Gallant

References

Bibliography
 James Robert Parish & Michael R. Pitts. Film directors: a guide to their American films. Scarecrow Press, 1974.

External links
 

1922 films
1922 Western (genre) films
American black-and-white films
Films directed by Harry Beaumont
Fox Film films
Silent American Western (genre) films
1920s English-language films
1920s American films